Davydiv is a village located in Lviv Raion, Lviv Oblast, Ukraine. Davydiv belongs to Davydiv rural hromada, one of the hromadas of Ukraine. The population is 6060 people.

Demographics
Native language as of the Ukrainian Census of 2001:
 Ukrainian 99.69%
 Russian 0.31%

References 

Villages in Lviv Raion